Thomas McDowell (born 1977) is a British man convicted of killing German trainee rabbi Andreas Hinz.

Thomas McDowell may also refer to:
 Thomas Clay McDowell, American businessman, racehorse owner, breeder, and trainer
 Thomas Bleakley McDowell, British Army officer and chief executive of The Irish Times
 Thomas David Smith McDowell, slave-owner and North Carolina politician

See also
 Thomas MacDowell, Bishop of Galloway